The 2008 AMA National Speedway Championship Series was staged over three rounds, which were held at Costa Mesa (June 7), Auburn (July 25) and Auburn (September 20). Defending champion Billy Hamill only raced in the opening round. In his absence, Billy Janniro won the title for the first time, winning all three rounds in the process. It was the first time neither Greg Hancock or Billy Hamill had won the title since Mike Faria in 1997.

Event format 
Over the course of 20 heats, each rider raced against every other rider once. The field was then split into sections of four riders, with the top four entering the 'A' Final. Points were then awarded depending on where a rider finished in each final. The points in the 'A' Final were awarded thus, 21, 18, 16 and 14. Bonus points were also awarded.

Classification

References 

AMA
United States
AMA National
Speed